Los Ayala is a small beach town and fishing village located in the municipality of Compostela, in the Mexican state of Nayarit.  It is one of the three towns that make the Jaltemba Bay, the other two being Rincón de Guayabitos and La Peñita de Jaltemba, which stretches from Punta Raza on the south to Playa Boca de Naranjo on the north. As of 2015, the population of Los Ayala is 316 inhabitants.

Situated at the foot of the Sierra de Vallejo mountain range, Los Ayala is the smallest and southernmost town in Jaltemba Bay. It is a quiet beach community with several small hotels, numerous family-style bungalows and a couple of trailer parks. The area is also known as a bird watching paradise where flocks of green parakeets, amiable pelicans, frigate birds, prancing egrets, inca doves, white doves, tropical king birds and the lone eagle can be seen.

References

External links
Los Ayala - Mexico’s Riviera Nayarit
Los Ayala - Explore Nayarit

Populated places in Nayarit
Beaches of Nayarit
Port cities and towns on the Mexican Pacific coast